Brandon Shack-Harris is a professional poker player who has won two World Series of Poker bracelets. He was born in Racine, Wisconsin and is based in Chicago.  Shack-Harris developed his skills in cash games at the Horseshoe Hammond.  As of 2020, his total live tournament winnings exceed $3,325,000.

World Series of Poker
Shack-Harris won his first bracelet in the 1,128-player 2014 Event #3: $1,000 Pot-Limit Omaha for $205,634. It was the first $1,000 buy-in Pot Limit Omaha event and the largest non-No Limit Hold'em field in the history of the World Series of Poker.  His second bracelet came in the 400-player 2016 Event #51 – $10,000 Eight-Handed Pot Limit Omaha World Championship. He defeated Loren Klein heads-up to win the bracelet and $894,300.

Notes

American poker players
World Series of Poker bracelet winners
Living people
1981 births
People from Chicago
People from Racine, Wisconsin